The Northern-Copper Country League (NCCL) was a Minor League Baseball league in operation for two seasons, 1906 and 1907. The league featured clubs representing cities in Michigan, Minnesota, North Dakota, and Manitoba. On March 18, 1906, the Copper Country Soo League and Northern League merged to form the NCCL.  The league was Class C in 1906 and Class D in 1907. The Grand Forks and Hancock clubs disbanded midway through the first season on July 29, 1906, and the entire league folded on September 2, 1907.  The Northern League was reestablished in some of the former territory in 1908.

Cities represented
 Duluth, MN: Duluth White Sox 1906-1907
 Fargo, ND: Fargo Trolley Dodgers 1906
 Grand Forks, ND: Grand Forks Forkers 1906
 Hancock, MI: Hancock Infants 1906
 Houghton, MI: Houghton Giants 1906-1907
 Lake Linden, MI: Lake Linden Sandy Lakes 1906
 Laurium, MI: Calumet Aristocrats 1906-1907
 Winnipeg, MB: Winnipeg Maroons 1906-1907

Teams & statistics
1906 Northern-Copper Country  League
President: W. J. Price 

The league, which became a C league on May 25, was formed as a merger between the Northern and Copper Country Soo Leagues.Hancock and Grand Forks disbanded July 29.
No Playoffs were scheduled.

1907 Northern-Copper Country League
President: W. J. Price 

The league was shortened to September 2.

Sources
The Encyclopedia of Minor League Baseball: Second and Third Editions.

Defunct minor baseball leagues in the United States
Sports leagues established in 1906
1906 establishments in the United States
Sports leagues disestablished in 1907